This is a list of Belarus national football team results from 2010 to the present day.

Results

2010

2011

2012

2013

2014

2015

2016

2017

2018

2019

2020

2021

2022

Notes

References

Belarus national football team results
2010s in Belarus
2020s in Belarus